SPEAKOUT is a debate show that airs Sundays on TFC after The Buzz.

The show is billed as the first Filipino American town hall program where Filipinos of all ages can come together and discuss the topics of the day and have them aired on international television.

See also
The Filipino Channel
ABS-CBN
ABS-CBN International

External links
IMDb

Philippine television talk shows
Debate television series